is a Japanese former professional baseball catcher. He has played in his entire career with the Nippon Professional Baseball (NPB) for the Hanshin Tigers.

Career

On April 4, 2009, Okazaki made his NPB debut.

After the 2020 season, Okazaki announced his retirement.

References

External links

NPB stats

1986 births
Living people
Baseball people from Nara Prefecture
Hanshin Tigers players
Japanese expatriate baseball players in the United States
Waikiki Beach Boys players
Nippon Professional Baseball catchers